The Summer Tic is the first EP by American rock band Paramore. It was released on June 18, 2006, and was sold during the 2006 Warped Tour and the tour supporting their previously released album, All We Know Is Falling. Copies were also sold on Fueled by Ramen store for a limited time. The name of the EP comes from a lyric of the song "Stuck on You", which is a cover of the Failure song. The EP includes an alternative version of "Emergency", a song which appeared on their debut studio album. The version features the original screaming done by former guitarist, Josh Farro, which was removed for All We Know Is Falling.

Track listing

Personnel 
Paramore
 Hayley Williams – vocals, keyboards
 Josh Farro – guitar, backing vocals
 Jeremy Davis – bass
 Zac Farro – drums
Additional
 Pete Thornton – production (track 3); mixing (tracks 1, 3, 4); additional production (track 1)
 Mike Green – production, recording (track 1, 2); mixing (track 1)
 Ted Jensen – mastering
 Brett Reighn – additional engineering, additional programming (track 3)
 James Rowand Jr. – additional engineering, additional programming (track 3)

References

External links
Fueled by Ramen web store
Paramore website (Archived)
The Summer Tic EP at MusicBrainz

2006 debut EPs
Paramore EPs
Self-released EPs